Border Guard Public School, Jessore, previously known as Rifles School, Jessore, is a secondary school located in Jhum Jhum Pur, Jessore city, Bangladesh.

See also
 List of schools in Bangladesh

References

Educational institutions established in 1996
Schools in Jessore District
High schools in Bangladesh
1996 establishments in Bangladesh